Honeysuckle Rose is the soundtrack to the 1980 musical drama film of the same name, which stars Willie Nelson. Tracks on the album include songs by Nelson and various artists including Kenneth Threadgill, Emmylou Harris, Johnny Gimble, Hank Cochran, Jeannie Seely and Dyan Cannon.

The song "On the Road Again" was nominated for Best Original Song in the 53rd Academy Awards.

Track listing

Personnel
Johnny Gimble – performer
Emmylou Harris – performer
Hank Cochran – performer
Kenneth Threadgill – performer
Amy Irving – performer
Willie Nelson – guitar, vocals, producer, main performer
Chris Ethridge – bass
Jody Payne – performer
Bradley Hartman – engineer, mixing
Jeannie Seely – performer

Charts

References

Musical film soundtracks
1980 soundtrack albums
Willie Nelson soundtracks
Columbia Records soundtracks
Drama film soundtracks